In enzymology, an ADP-ribosyl-[dinitrogen reductase] hydrolase is an enzyme that catalyzes the chemical reaction

ADP-D-ribosyl-[dinitrogen reductase]  ADP-D-ribose + [dinitrogen reductase]

Hence, this enzyme has one substrate, [[ADP-D-ribosyl-[dinitrogen reductase]]], and two products, ADP-D-ribose and dinitrogen reductase.

This enzyme belongs to the family of hydrolases, specifically those glycosylases that hydrolyse N-glycosyl compounds.  The systematic name of this enzyme class is ADP-D-ribosyl-[dinitrogen reductase] ADP-ribosylhydrolase. Other names in common use include azoferredoxin glycosidase, azoferredoxin-activating enzymes, dinitrogenase reductase-activating glycohydrolase, and ADP-ribosyl glycohydrolase.

See also
ADP-ribosylhydrolase

References

 

EC 3.2.2
Enzymes of unknown structure